Hanumangarh Assembly constituency is one of constituencies of Rajasthan Legislative Assembly in the Ganganagar (Lok Sabha constituency).

Hanumangarh Constituency covers all voters from part of Hanumangarh tehsil, which includes ILRC Hanumangarh including Hanumangarh Municipal Board, ILRC Ronawali, ILRC Pucca Sarnan, ILRC Fatehgarh, ILRC Lakhuwali and ILRC Norangdesar.

Election Results
2018

INC	Vinod Kumar	111,207	50.00%	15,522
BJP	Rampratap	95,685	43.00%	
Communist Party Of India (Marxist)	Raghuver Singh	4,347	2.00%	
BSP	Jetha Ram	2,529	1.00

References

See also 
Member of the Legislative Assembly (India)

Hanumangarh district
Assembly constituencies of Rajasthan